Headlam Group plc is a British based company which distributes floor coverings throughout Europe. It specializes in carpet, residential vinyl, wood, laminate, luxury vinyl tile, and commercial flooring. Headlam Group is currently listed on the main market of the London Stock Exchange

History 
Headlam Group was established in 1992 by way of a series of acquisitions from Hickson plc which began with the purchase of Headlam Newcastle and Hadfields Stockport early that year. In 2011 Headlam Group purchased a Scottish-based company, West Fife Flooring for £1.2million. Its international expansion began with the purchase of Lethem-Vergeer in the Netherlands in 1996.

Operations
Headlam Group supplies coverings including parquet, carpets, and linoleum to independent retailers and professional customers in markets which include the Netherlands, France and Switzerland.

References

External links
Official site
Yahoo profile

Wholesalers of the United Kingdom
Companies listed on the London Stock Exchange
Companies based in Birmingham, West Midlands
Business services companies established in 1992
1992 establishments in England